Wattebledia is a genus of freshwater snails with a gill and an operculum, an aquatic gastropod mollusks in the family Bithyniidae.

The generic name Wattebledia is in honor of French malacologist Gustave-Éduard Joseph Wattebled (1844-1886).

Distribution 
The native distribution of this species includes Thailand (3 species).

Species 
Species in the genus Wattebledia include:
 Wattebledia baschi (Brandt, 1968)
 Wattebledia crosseana (Wattebled, 1886)
 Wattebledia siamensis (Moellendorff, 1902)

References

External links 

Bithyniidae